Cymothoe megaesta is a butterfly in the family Nymphalidae. It is found in Cameroon.

The larvae feed on Rinorea lepidobotrys.

References

Butterflies described in 1890
Cymothoe (butterfly)
Endemic fauna of Cameroon
Butterflies of Africa